The Concordat between bodies inspecting, regulating and auditing health or social care (2004) is a "voluntary agreement between organisations that regulate, audit, inspect or review elements of health and healthcare in England".  It is made up of 10 objectives designed to promote closer working between the signatories.  Each objective is underpinned by a number of practices that focus developments on areas that will help to secure effective implementation.

Signatories
There are full and associate signatories to the concordat.

A similar agreement was concluded by bodies reviewing health and social care in Wales in 2005.

Full signatories
 Audit Commission
 Care Quality Commission (CQC) - from April 2009
 Conference of Postgraduate Medical Deans (COPMeD)
 General Medical Council (GMC)
 Health and Safety Executive (HSE)
 Human Fertilisation and Embryology Authority (HFEA)
 National Audit Office (NAO)
 NHS Counter Fraud and Security Management Service (NHS CFSMS)
 NHS Litigation Authority (NHSLA)
 Postgraduate Medical Education and Training Board (PMETB)
 Skills for Health

Former full signatories
 Commission for Social Care Inspection (CSCI) - until March 2009
 Healthcare Commission - until March 2009
 Mental Health Act Commission (MHAC) - until March 2009

Associate signatories
 Academy of Medical Royal Colleges
 Council for Healthcare Regulatory Excellence
 Department of Health
 Information Centre for Health and Social Care
 Healthcare Inspectorate Wales
 NHS Confederation
 Quality Assurance Agency for Higher Education
 United Kingdom Accreditation Forum

References

Medical and health organisations based in England
Department of Health and Social Care
National Health Service (England)
Social care in England